Aureilhan is the name of the following communes in France:

 Aureilhan, Landes, in the Landes department
 Aureilhan, Hautes-Pyrénées, in the Hautes-Pyrénées department